Luke Robert David Strong  (born 7 December 1993) is a British trampoline gymnast. Strong won bronze at the 2014 European Championships.

Strong nearly lost his leg in 2009 when he sustained a severe injury during a training session. Strong has made a full recovery and in the trials for the 2012 London Olympics, he missed out by 0.1 of a point. However, in 2014 Strong became the first British male senior trampoline gymnast to win a medal at a European championships in the last 32 years, winning bronze in Portugal.

Achievements

2011 British Championship - GOLD
2011 World Cup CHN - 4th synchro (with Nathan Bailey)
2011 World Cup Kawasaki JPN, July - 5th
2011 World Cup CZE - 8th in synchro (with Nathan Bailey)
2011 World Ranking List  – Ranked 18th individual and ranked 5th synchro (with Nathan Bailey)
2011 World Championships - Synchro finalist with Nathan Bailey
2013 British Championships - SILVER
2013 World Championship individual - 12th
2014 European Championships - BRONZE 
2015 British Championship - GOLD
2016 British Championship - BRONZE
2016 New British Record for Difficulty - 17.8DD 
2016 Rio Olympics Reserve

Injuries

In 2009, Strong sustained a serious injury to one of his legs. In a statement to the Liverpool Echo, Strong’s coach, Jay Scouler, said,  "Luke’s injury was the worst I’ve ever experienced with one of my athletes. The doctors said they may take his leg off. They were talking about amputation." But Strong made a full recovery and returned to compete in 2010 and won bronze in the British Trampoline Championships. In the beginning of 2015, Strong had another accident, again breaking his leg, but by June 2015 he was fully recovered.

References

1993 births
Bisexual men
British male trampolinists
European Games competitors for Great Britain
Gymnasts at the 2015 European Games
English LGBT sportspeople
LGBT gymnasts
Living people
Medalists at the Trampoline Gymnastics World Championships
Sportspeople from Liverpool
Bisexual sportspeople